Kondor (also Romanized as Kandar, Kondar, and Kundar) is a village in Qaqazan-e Sharqi Rural District, in the Central District of Takestan County, Qazvin Province, Iran. At the 2006 census, its population was 1,313, in 304 families.

References 

Populated places in Takestan County